James Alexander Steele (April 10, 1884 – March 23, 1928) was a Canadian sports shooter. He competed in the 1000 yard free rifle event at the 1908 Summer Olympics.

References

1884 births
1928 deaths
Canadian male sport shooters
Olympic shooters of Canada
Shooters at the 1908 Summer Olympics
Place of birth missing
20th-century Canadian people